cGMP-dependent 3',5'-cyclic phosphodiesterase is an enzyme that in humans is encoded by the PDE2A gene.

References

Further reading